The First football match in mainland Portugal took place in Campo Pequeno, Lisboa on 22 January 1889. Three months earlier, on October 1888, a test match had already been held in Cascais contested between members of the Sporting Club of Cascais, one of the first clubs dedicated to football in Portugal. However, the one held in January was the first proper match in Portuguese history, since the pitch had markings and goalposts, and the match followed the rules and lasted 90 minutes, being also the first public match in Portugal. It was also more competitive because the match was contested between Portuguese noblemen and a group of English workers living in Portugal, and thus it can be considered as one of the first ‘international’ matches in the history of the sport. Both games were held at the initiative of Guilherme Pinto Basto, one of the members of Cascais club. Lisbon's high society turned out in force to see what that game was like.

Among the figures who played in the test match, there was a count, viscounts, other prominent members of Lisbon's high society, and several members of the Cascais Club, including four members of the Pinto Basto family, such as Guilherme and his two brothers, Eduardo and Frederico, who had brought balls back from England, where they were studying. The best players from the first exhibition game made up a selection of the Portuguese team that played against the British at the Campo Pequeno. Consequently, football started attracting the attention of high society, distinguished by the Luso-British rivalry.

Background
Portugal was introduced to football in the late 19th century by a combination of British immigrant workers, visiting sailors and Portuguese students returning from Britain. Lisboa, a city open to the world through the sea, kept a close trade and industrial relations with Britain at the end of the 19th century, thus being the home to an important British colony that also played football, a British phenomenon that was giving its first steps in Europe.

The first notable entity dedicated to, among other sports, football, was the Sporting Club of Cascais founded in 1879, which was a very elite club, patronized by King Luis and King Carlos and by those who could afford to be close to the Royal Family, among which the Pinto Basto family stand out. The Pinto Basto brothers (Guilherme, Eduardo and Frederico), were the fundamental heads behind the spread of football in mainland Portugal. They had been introduced to football while studying in England at St George's College and Eduardo played a decisive role in the development of football in Portugal when he ordered a series of footballs from England, which he distributed to various military units, thus giving a huge boost to the practice of this sport.

Test/exhibition match

In October 1888, Guilherme organized an exhibition match in Cascais, considered to be the first match on mainland Portugal. It was held at the Parada de Cascais, the former Parade grounds of the Cascais Citadel, situated next to the Sporting Club (now the Museum of the Sea). They reportedly spent the morning of the game removing stones from the field.

Pinto Basto himself, years later, said that that first contact with the ball was nothing more than a "rehearsal" where 28 nobles got to know the game of football. Among the figures who played that day, there was a count, viscounts, other prominent members of Lisbon's high society, and four members of the Pinto Basto family. More specifically, some of the nobles were the councilor Aires de Ornelas, Francisco Alte, Hugo O'Neil, the Viscount of Asseca, the Marquis of Borba, the Count of S. Lourenço and Francisco Figueira. Notably, Aires de Ornelas had been an army officer, and after heroic campaigns in Africa he was a minister in several governments of the Portuguese monarchy.

Overview
On the afternoon of 22 January 1889, a few months after the "rehearsal" in Cascais, Guilherme organizes a more serious and competitive match, a game which is now considered the first major duel of football in Portugal. It was contested between the Portuguese noblemen and a group of English workers living in Lisboa, so it can then be considered one of the first ‘international’ matches in the history of the sport. The game was held where today's Campo Pequeno bullring is located, a venue that was the opposite of the relaxed and familiar setting built by those 28 aristocrats on the grounds of Parada. Unlike in Cascais, this time they played with markings and goalposts, with the players themselves arriving early to paint the lines of the field and carry the goals on their shoulders and fix them on the ground to be able to play the game properly.

The English were made up of employees of Cabo Submarino, Casa Graham and other English houses installed in Lisbon. The Portuguese team, on the other hand, was made up of a selection of the best players from the first public exhibition. Calling on some of those 28 aristocrats, Guilherme Pinto Basto put together a team that was made up of João Saldanha Pinto Basto, João Bregaro, Eduardo Romero, Eduardo Pinto Basto, Afonso Vilar, D. Simão de Sousa Coutinho (Borba), Eduardo Pinto Coelho, Frederico Pinto Basto, Fernando Pinto Basto, Augusto Moller and Henrique Vilar. There were still no fixed positions, except for the goalkeeper, and game tactics do not seem to have existed, even because the only objective was to kick the ball forward in an attempt to introduce it into the opponent's goal. Regarding the equipment, they wore clothes for all tastes, some even wearing shoes to play. There were those wearing striped bathing suits, others in convict clothing wearing shoes instead of boots, and almost all of them wearing a peculiar hat reminiscent of an ice cream seller wandering the beaches. The English were more uniform in dress, and their formation was: J. Frazer, J. Mason, C. Anderson. Wray. R. W. Watson, Rawstron, Govan, Briggs, F. Palmer, C. Cox, and one more unidentified element. Notably, F. Palmer appears in the line-up of Club Lisbonense in the 1894 Taça D. Carlos I, which means he kept playing football with the Pinto Basto brothers for the next few years. There is evidence that the most advanced English used tactic systems over the Portuguese's pure "kicking" chaos, and yet, they still lost the match, although it is not known by how many or who were the authors of the goals of this historic goals. However, it has been widely believed throughout the years that the result was 2–1.

The chronicles of the match report the following: "A huge number of people went to Campo Pequeno today to watch the match of football between the English and Portuguese. A large number of carriages with elegant ladies, among which Mademoiselle Ida Blanc stood out, gallantly ruling, alongside her mother, a superb team of black horses. The result of the game was very flattering for our compatriots who managed to win. There was no lack of tumbles and rolls from the game itself, showing all the strong young men who took part in it, how expert they are in “managing” the kick, as an elegant woman who, by chance, happened to be next to us said". Lisbon's high society turned out in force to see what that game was like.

Final details

|valign="top" width="50%"|

|}

Legacy
The taste for football gradually spread, especially among the elites, and quickly even King D. Carlos became a fan. Football started attracting the attention of high society, distinguished by the Luso-British rivalry. The British brought maturity to Portuguese football, which was still in its infancy. When the Pinto Basto brothers founded Club Lisbonense in 1892, one of the very first football clubs in Portugal, they played their first games also against Englishmen. These ones worked at the Cable & Wireless cable station at Carcavelos, who would eventually organize themselves into a Club, the Carcavelos Club.

With the expansion of the club scene a little across the country, the modality began to chain to itself environments of greater competitiveness and interest with the dispute of the first competitions at the club level, such as the 1894 Taça D. Carlos I, contested by Club Lisbonense and Oporto Cricket and Lawn Tennis Club, ending in a win to the former, who fielded Guilherme and Eduardo Pinto Basto and F. Palmer, who played for the English side on that day in Campo Pequeno.

See also
Football in Portugal

References

Sport in Lisbon
Sport in Portugal
1888 in association football
1889 in association football
19th century in Portugal